The Ace Ventura franchise, originally created by Jack Bernstein, consists of American detective-comedies, with two theatrical films, one made-for-television film, and one animated television series. The overall story follows the criminal investigations of the titular and comedic pet detective.

The first and second films were met with mixed reviews, were exceptionally successful financially, and were credited with launching the career of Jim Carrey. The two films have earned the status of cult classics.

Background

Ace Ventura

Bernstein later acknowledged that the concept for the character of Ace Ventura came from wanting to do a comedic version of Sherlock Holmes and watching the Stupid Pet Tricks segment on Late Night with David Letterman.

Films

Ace Ventura: Pet Detective (1994)

Ace Ventura is hired to rescue Snowflake, the bottlenose dolphin mascot of the Miami Dolphins. Despite his best efforts to save Dan Marino, Ace is also kidnapped. When Ace finds out a murder is connected, he soon begins to suspect that disgraced football player Ray Finkle is behind it all. However, Ace can't find Finkle, until Ace discovers that Finkle has been masquerading as Lt. Lois Einhorn.

Ace Ventura: When Nature Calls (1995)

Ace is dispatched to Africa to investigate the disappearance of a sacred white bat battling his fear of bats along the way.

Ace Ventura Jr.: Pet Detective (2009)

Ace Ventura, Jr. follows in his father's footsteps in being a pet detective. Years ago his father has disappeared, after voyage through the Bermuda Triangle. Now a number of animals go missing, and his mother is placed in jail after suspicion of guilt is ordered. Ace works with a number of friends to uncover the true culprit, and rescue his mother from conviction.

Potential sequel
In December 2019, a third Ace Ventura film starring Jim Carrey was revealed to be in early development. By March 2021, the film was officially announced to be in development with Pat Casey and Josh Miller signed on as co-screenwriters. The project will be a joint-venture production within Warner Bros. Pictures, Morgan Creek Entertainment, Amazon Studios, and Prime Video Original Films, with plans to be released simultaneously theatrically and via streaming as an Amazon Prime Video exclusive. In August of the same year, Carrey confirmed his involvement and stated that he was "more than ready for the next chapter". By April 2022 however, Carrey revealed that he was considering to retire from acting. The actor stated that "[he] might continue down the road, but [he's] taking a break from acting", while elaborating that if a script is presented to him that he feels like is needed to be created he may reconsider. Carrey later stated that while there are no official plans for the film, he joked that he would star in the film if Christopher Nolan was to direct.

Television

Ace Ventura: Pet Detective (1995–2000)

An animated series, titled Ace Ventura: Pet Detective – The Animated Series, aired from December 1995 to February 2000. Created by Duane Capizzi for Warner Bros. Television, the first two seasons aired on CBS. In 1999, when reruns debuted on Nickelodeon, a third season was developed and aired. Many of the characters from the movie were retained, though voiced by a new cast. While the original movies had a strongly cartoon-style comedic aesthetic, the animated series is characterized by slapstick and children-friendly cartoon humor. Seth MacFarlane was among the writers over the course of the show's run, displaying similar humor to his later series.
 
The titular character, voiced by Canadian actor Michael Hall, continues his goofy antics as a private investigator for animals of all species. Despite running in a time slot after another popular Jim Carrey movie-based cartoon, The Mask: Animated Series, and debuting a crossover episode between the two series (with "The Aceman Cometh"), the series failed to garner enough views to be renewed. Ultimately, both The Mask and Ace Ventura were cancelled. A third season followed the cancellation, before once again being cancelled.

Main cast and characters
 A  indicates an actor or actress was uncredited for their role.
 A  indicates the actor or actress lent only his or her voice for his or her film character.
 A dark gray cell indicates the character was not in the film.

Additional crew and production details

Reception

Box office performance

Critical and public response

Music

Soundtracks
 Ace Ventura: Pet Detective (Original Motion Picture Soundtrack)
 Ace Ventura: When Nature Calls (Original Motion Picture Soundtrack)
 Ace Ventura Jr.: Pet Detective (Original Motion Picture Soundtrack)

Video games
Various licensed video games for various arcade and home console systems were released:

Ace Ventura: Pet Detective – a handheld LCD video game released in 1995, to coincide with the release of Ace Ventura: When Nature Calls.
 
Ace Ventura: When Nature Calls – a handheld LCD video game released in 1995, to coincide with the titular film.
 
Ace Ventura: The CD-Rom Game – developed by 7th Level, the game was released on PC CD-ROM in 1996. Based on the animated series Ace Ventura: Pet Detective, the gameplay was an example of the point-and-click adventure genre. The game was met with mixed reception, including a 6.6 out of 10 from GameSpot, while Gamezilla gave it 58 out of 100.

Ace Ventura: Pet Detective - The Case of the Serial Shaver – developed by Brilliant Digital Entertainment, the game was released on PC CD-ROM in 2000. The gameplay involved a choose your own adventure mechanic. Jack Feldstein was the writer/developer of this interactive story.

References

External links

Film series introduced in 1994
 
Comedy film franchises
Warner Bros. Pictures franchises
Films adapted into television shows